Caladenia minorata, commonly known as the small waxlip orchid, is a plant in the orchid family Orchidaceae and is endemic to eastern Australia. It is a ground orchid with a single very hairy leaf and one or two deep violet-blue flowers. It has been known as Glossodia minor since its description by the prolific Scottish botanist Robert Brown in 1810, but recent discoveries suggest its inclusion in the genus Caladenia. It is similar to Caladenia major (formerly Glossodia major) but is smaller in all its parts.

Description
Caladenia minorata is a terrestrial, perennial, deciduous, herb with an underground tuber. The outer surface of the sepals and petals is light coloured and hairy. The lateral sepals have similar dimensions to the dorsal sepal and spread apart from each other. At the base of the labellum there are two large, club-shaped calli joined at their bases, each with a fleshy black top. Flowering occurs from July to October, more prolifically after bushfire.

Taxonomy and naming
The small waxlip orchid was first formally described in 1810 by Robert Brown who gave it the name Glossodia minor and published the description in Prodromus Florae Novae Hollandiae. In 2015, as a result of studies of molecular phylogenetics, Mark Clements changed the name to Caladenia minorata. The specific epithet (minorata) is a Latin word meaning to "threaten" or "menace".

Glossodia minor is regarded as a synonym of the name Caladenia minorata which is accepted by the Royal Botanic Gardens, Kew.

Distribution and habitat
Caladenia minorata is mainly found along the eastern coastline of Queensland, New South Wales and Victoria. In New South Wales it is most common in coastal heath, but there are records from as far west as Temora. It is mainly restricted to coastal grasstree plains in East Gippsland in Victoria but there are records from as far west as Wilsons Promontory.

References

minorata
Plants described in 1810
Endemic orchids of Australia
Orchids of New South Wales
Orchids of Queensland
Orchids of Victoria (Australia)